The Minolta CLE is a TTL-metering automatic exposure aperture-priority 35 mm rangefinder camera using Leica M lenses, introduced by Minolta in 1980.

Leica and Minolta signed a technical cooperation agreement in June 1972. One of its results was the joint development of the Leica CL, a compact rangefinder camera introduced in 1973 and discontinued a few years later. The CLE was a new rangefinder body resembling the Leica CL.

Description

The Minolta CLE is based on the Minolta XG-series SLRs. The viewfinder has projected frames for 28 mm, 40 mm and 90 mm focal lengths. It had a black finish, except for run of 300 gold-plated cameras sold in the Japanese market.

The CLE has an electronic focal plane shutter to 1/1000 seconds, and a through-the-lens (TTL) silicon photodiode (SPD) exposure meter with aperture-priority automatic or manual exposure, and automated ambient and flash exposure metering system continuing to work and dynamically adjusting the shutter speed and TTL, off the film (OTF) flash during the exposure itself. The ambient metering worked in a very similar way to that employed by the then current Olympus OM-2n single-lens reflex camera(SLR) camera. Ambient light was measured by the SPD as it was reflected off a pattern on the shutter curtains. It also proved particularly useful if filters were being used. None of these features would appear on any other body for M-mount lenses until the Konica Hexar RF of 1999, which has all but TTL-OTF flash metering and dynamic exposure.

Lenses
Three of Minolta's Rokkor brand of lenses were made specially for the CLE: the M-Rokkor 28 mm 2.8 wide-angle, the M-Rokkor (-QF) 40 mm 2 standard, and the M-Rokkor 90 mm 4 telephoto.

The earlier Leica CL 40 mm and 90 mm lenses had single coatings, and later Minolta CL-E versions of these two lenses, plus a 28 mm, were multi-coated, with the same optical scheme. The earlier Leica CLs did not have 28 mm frame-lines.

Notes

External links
  Minolta CLE at Cameraquest

CLE